Riau Malays (Jawi: ملايو رياو, Melayu Riau) is a Malays sub-ethnic originating from the Riau and Riau Islands province. The main areas of the Riau Malays are on the east coast of Riau, mostly in Bengkalis, Indragiri Hulu, Kampar, and the Pekanbaru City area which was the base of the Malay Kingdom in the past. The Riau Malays are famous for Riau Malay Literature which is well applied in rhymes, syair, gurindam, hikayat, karmina, seloka, traditional poems, local proverbs, mantras, and romance stories, as well as other forms of expression which they use to express their feelings.

Etymology 
Malay, derived from the word Malaya dvipa from the Hindu scripture Purana which means land surrounded by water which refers to a Old Malay Kingdom in Jambi in the 7th century.
 
The name riau itself has three opinions. First, from Portuguese word, rio means river. In 1514, there was a Portuguese military expedition exploring the Siak River, with the aim of finding the location of a kingdom that they believe exists in the area, at the same time pursuing the followers of Sultan Mahmud Syah who withdrew to Kampar after the fall of the Sultanate of Malacca. The second opinion "riau" comes from the word "riahi" which means sea water, which is thought to have come from the book One Thousand and One Nights.
 
The third opinion is taken from the word rioh or noisy which comes from the naming of the local people which means crowded, the hustle and bustle of working peoples, which became known since Raja Kecik moved the center of the Malay kingdom from Johor to Riau ulu in 1719. This name was used as one of the four main countries that formed the kingdoms of Riau, Lingga, Johor, and Pahang. However, the result of the London Treaty of 1824 between Dutch and England resulted in the splitting of this kingdom into two. The Johor-Pahang hemisphere is under British influence, Meanwhile, the Riau-Lingga hemisphere was under the influence of the Dutch.

Origin 
Riau is thought to have been inhabited since 10,000,000-14,000,000 BC. This conclusion was drawn after the discovery of tools from the Pleistocene era in the Sengingi River watershed in Kuantan Singingi Regency in August 2009. The stone tools found included a penetak ax, perimbas, shaver, flakes, and core stones which are the basic ingredients for making shaver, and flakes. The research team also found some wood fossils that are thought to be older than the stone tools. It is suspected that the human user of the tools found in Riau is Pithecanthropus erectus, as has been found in Central Java.

 
The Riau Malay Empire was also a continuation of the Sriwijaya Empire heritage based on religion Buddhist. This is evidence of the discovery of Muara Takus Temple which is thought to be the center of the Srivijaya government, which has an architecture resembling the temples in India. Besides that, George Cœdès also found similarities in the structure of the Srivijaya government with the Malay sultanates of the 15th century. The Malay kingdom started from the 12th century Bintan-Tumasik Kingdom, followed by a period of Islamic Malay Sultanates.
 
The earliest text that discusses the Malay world is Sulalatus Salatin or what is known as Sejarah Melayu by Tun Sri Lanang, in 1612. According to the book, Seguntang Hill is the place where The Sapurba came, whose descendants were scattered throughout the Malay World. Sang Mutiara became king in Tanjungpura and Sang Nila Utama became king of Bintan before finally moving to Singapore.

Religion 
"So all the Malay customs are also valid according to Syarak and Syariah. It is these customs that have been passed down from generation to generation to the land of Johor, the land of Riau, the land of Indragiri, the land of Siak, the land of Pelalawan, and all the lands of the Malays. All customs that are not based on Islamic law are wrong and cannot be used anymore. Since then, Malay customs have been called syarak-based customs which adhere to the book of Allah and the sunnah of the Prophet".<p style="text-align: right;">— Tonel, 1920.
 
Malay society in general is identical with Islam which is the foundation of the source of their customs. Therefore, the customs of the Riau Malays bersendikan syarak and syarak bersendikan Kitabullah.
 
Prior to the arrival of Islam to the archipelago, many parts of the region were under the Srivijaya Kingdom between the 7th and 14th centuries which were heavily influenced by Hindu-Buddhist traditions. At that time Islam had been introduced when the Maharaja of Srivijaya sent a letter to the Caliph Umar bin Abdul Aziz, containing a request to send a messenger to explain Islamic law to him.
 
In the 12th century, the entry of Islam into the archipelago was brought through the Samudera Pasai which had been recognized as the pioneer of the Islamic empire in the archipelago in its time.
 
The process of Islamic expansion occurred through trade, marriage and missionary activities of Muslim scholars. These factors led to the peaceful spread and growing influence of Islam throughout the Malay World. A strong factor in the acceptance of Islam by the Malay community is the aspect of human equality, which according to the ideology of the people at that time adhered to the caste system in Hinduism, where the lower caste society is lower than the higher caste members.
 
The golden age when Malacca became an Islamic sultanate. Many elements of Islamic law, including political science and administration, are incorporated into Malacca law, especially Law Qanun Malacca. The ruler of Melaka was given the title 'Sultan' and was responsible for the religion of Islam. In the 15th century Islam spread and developed throughout the Melaka region including the entire Malay Peninsula, Riau Islands, Bintan, Lingga, and several areas on the east coast of Sumatra, namely Jambi, Bengkalis, Siak, Rokan, Indragiri, Kampar, and Kuantan. Malacca is considered a catalyst in the expansion of Islam to other areas such as Palembang, Sumatra, Patani in Southern Thailand, North Borneo, Brunei, Sulu Islands, and Mindanao.
 
On the other hand, people Sakai and Talang Mamak still adhere to Animism. Along with the times, many residents of Sakai and Talang Mamak have embraced Islam. Even so, the shift in belief did not eliminate their habit of practicing the teachings of their ancestors.

Language 

Riau Malay language has a fairly long history, because the history began in the Sriwijaya Empire, At that time Malay had become the language of trade in the Archipelago. Initially the center of the kingdom was in Malacca then moved to Johor, and finally moved to Riau. Since then, Riau has been given the title as the center of the Malay kingdom. Therefore, the Malay language of the Malacca era was known as Malacca Malay, Johor Malay is known as Johor Malay and Riau Malay is known as Riau Malay.
 
Riau Malay language has been nurtured in such a way by Raja Ali Haji, so that this language already has standards in its day and has also been widely published, in the form of; literary books, history and religion books in the era of classical Malay literature in the 19th century.

Dialects 
The Riau Malays speak Malay which can be divided into two, namely the mainland Riau dialect and the Riau Islands dialect. The Riau Mainland dialect has phonological characteristics that are close to Minangkabau language, while the Riau Islands dialect has phonological characteristics that are close to Malaysian Malay in the Selangor, Johor and Malacca regions.
 
In addition to various other characteristics, these two dialects are characterized by words which in Indonesian are words that end in vowels /a/; in the Riau Mainland dialect it is pronounced with a vowel /o/, while in the Riau Islands dialect it is pronounced /e/ weak. Some examples include: The mention of the word /bila/, /tiga/, /kata/ in Indonesian will be so in the Riau Mainland dialect: /bilo/, /tigo/, /kato/. While in the Riau Islands dialect it becomes: /bile/, /tige/, /kate/.

Writing 

Jawi alphabet (جاوي), also known as the Arabic-Malay alphabet, is the Arabic alphabet which was changed to write Malay in other words, the Jawi script is the withered Arabic script. This alphabet is used as one of the official writings in Brunei, and also in Malaysia, Indonesia, Pattani Province in Thailand, dan Singapore for religious and educational purposes.

Culture

Kinship system 
Each nuclear family lives in their own house, except for new couples who usually prefer to stay at the wife's house until they have their first child. Therefore, their pattern of settling can be said to be neolocal. The nuclear family they call sex generally build a house in the neighborhood where the wife lives. The principle of lineage or kinship is more likely to be parental or bilateral.
 
Kinship relations are carried out with special greeting words. The first child is called long or eldest, second child ngah/ongah, below is called cik, the youngest is called cu/ucu. Usually the call is added by mentioning the physical characteristics of the person concerned, for example cik itam if cik that black skinned, ngah utih if ngah it's white, cu andak if ucu that's a short person, cik unggal if buyung it's an only child and so on. But sometimes when greeting people they don't know or they just know, they simply call with the greeting abang, akak, dek, or nak.
 
In the past, the Malays also lived in groups according to their origins, which they called tribes. This lineage of descent uses a patrilineal kinship line. However, the Riau Malays who live on the mainland of Sumatra partially adhere to a matrilineal ethnic understanding. There are also call the people hinduk or the forerunner. Each people is led by a penghulu. If the tribe lives in a village, then the penghulu immediately becomes Datuk Penghulu Kampung or Village Head. Each penghulu is also assisted by several figures such as batin, jenang, tua-tua, and monti. In the field of religion known leaders such as imam and khatib.

Traditional house 

In traditional Malay society, the house is a complete building that can be used as a family residence, a place for deliberation, a place of descent, a place of refuge for anyone in need. Therefore, traditional Malay houses are generally large. In addition to being large, Malay houses are also always in the form of a stage or a house with a pit, facing the rising sun.

Types of Malay houses include residential houses, hall houses, houses of worship and storage houses. The naming is adjusted to the function of each building.
In general, there are five types of Riau Malay traditional houses, namely:
 Malay House Roof Lontik.
 Malay House Roof Lipat Kajang.
 Malay House Roof Lipat Pandan.

Traditional clothing 

Malay clothes are common clothes for men that are used in general by Malays and their families in the archipelago, especially Riau. There are two types the first is a long sleeve shirt which has a raised stiff collar known as a collar Cekak Musang. A pair of shirts and pants are usually made of the same type of fabric, namely silk, cotton, or a mixture of polyester and cotton. Side cloth is a complementary cloth that is often used to mix and match with Malay clothes, either made of songket cloth or sarong. A black headgear commonly known as songkok or peci is worn to complete the outfit.
 
As for women, it is kurung in the form of a long loose dress, consisting of a skirt and blouse. Usually the skirt is made of a long cloth made of songket, sarong or batik with pleats on one side.

Traditional cuisine 
Riau Malay traditional cuisine has many similarities with other Rumpun Malay and Sumatran cuisine in general which uses a lot of spices and coconut milk to produce goulash food which is seasoned, savory, fatty, and thick to reddish and dark yellow in color. Most of the menu uses fish as basic ingredients, from patin, lomek, baung, anchovy, tenggiri, pari, and crustaceans, and often use buffalo or beef meat. Additional seasoning commonly used is belacan. Almost every Malay dish is served with white rice or with nasi lemak and usually eaten by hand.

References 

 

Riau
Ethnic groups in Indonesia